Nenad Miljenović (born April 8, 1993) is a Serbian professional basketball player for OKK Beograd of the  Basketball League of Serbia.

Professional career
Miljenović started playing basketball with the youth ranks of FMP. In October 2011, Miljenović signed his first professional contract with Partizan Belgrade. In December 2011, he was loaned to Mega Vizura. On September 25, 2012, he signed a termination of his contract with Partizan.

Only one day after his contract termination with Partizan, Miljenović signed a four-year contract with Serbian team Radnički Kragujevac, on September 26, 2012.

On July 23, 2013, Miljenović signed a one-year deal with his former team, Mega Vizura.

In June 2014, he extended his contract with Mega Vizura. With the departure of Vasilije Micić from the team, his role in the team increased during the 2014–15 season. In the first game of the 2014–15 ABA League season for his team, he scored 26 points, and added 10 assists, to help his team defeat MZT Skopje, by a score of 103–98. He has been named the ABA League Player of the Month for October of the 2014–15 ABA League season. Over 24 games played during the 2014–15 Adriatic League season, he averaged 13.3 points, 4.6 rebounds, and a league leading 8.4 assists per game. During the same season he was named MVP of the Round five times, was the assists leader of the season and was a very close second player in MVP standings behind his teammate Nikola Jokić.

On August 19, 2015, he signed a three-year contract with the Spanish team Sevilla. After one season with Sevilla in the Spanish Liga ACB, he parted ways with the club.

On July 5, 2016, Miljenović signed with the Greek club PAOK of the Greek Basket League.

On February 1, 2019, Miljenović joined the ABA League team Olimpija. He averaged 15 points and 7 assists per game.

In August 2020, he signed with San-en NeoPhoenix of the Japanese B.League.

National team career
Miljenović was a member of the junior national teams of Serbia. With Serbia's junior national teams, he played at the following tournaments: the 2009 FIBA Europe Under-16 Championship, where he won a bronze medal, the 2010 FIBA Under-17 World Championship, the 2011 FIBA Europe Under-18 Championship, where he won a silver medal, the 2012 FIBA Europe Under-20 Championship, and the 2013 FIBA Europe Under-20 Championship.

Off the court 
Miljenović and Rade Zagorac established the ABA League Players Union in July 2020. The Union is a non-profit organization and trade union based in Belgrade, Serbia, that represents ABA League players.

References

External links
 Nenad Miljenović at acb.com 
 Nenad Miljenović at basketballcl.com 
 Nenad Miljenović at baskethotel.com
 Nenad Miljenović at draftexpress.com
 Nenad Miljenović at esake.gr 
 Nenad Miljenović at eurobasket.com
 Nenad Miljenović at euroleague.net
 Nenad Miljenović at fiba.com (archive)
 Nenad Miljenović at fibaeurope.com

1993 births
Living people
Basketball players from Belgrade
ABA League players
Basketball League of Serbia players
Real Betis Baloncesto players
Greek Basket League players
KK Mega Basket players
KK Partizan players
KK Radnički Kragujevac (2009–2014) players
OKK Beograd players
Liga ACB players
P.A.O.K. BC players
KK Olimpija players
San-en NeoPhoenix players
Serbian expatriate basketball people in Greece
Serbian expatriate basketball people in Japan
Serbian expatriate basketball people in Romania
Serbian expatriate basketball people in Spain
Serbian expatriate basketball people in Slovenia
Serbian men's basketball players
Point guards